Beeds Lake State Park is located northwest of Hampton, Iowa, United States. It was listed has a historic district on the National Register of Historic Places as Beeds Lake State Park, Civilian Conservation Corps Area in 1990.  At the time of its nomination it contained 21 resources, which included one contributing building, 15 contributing structures, and five non-contributing structures.  The  park surrounds a  reservoir.  It features hiking trails, boating, fishing, swimming, camping, picnic areas and shelters, lodges and concessions.

History
Springbrook Creek was dammed and a sawmill was built in 1857. A flour mill was established two years later. The property was bought by William Beed in 1864 and he continued the operation until 1903-1904. The dike washed-out between 1910 and 1913, and the mill was taken down in 1916. The following year the  mill pond was drained. The local Izaak Walton League desired to create a  lake as early as 1926. The City of Hampton and several civic organizations bought the property the following year and presented it to the State of Iowa. The city requested that the Civilian Conservation Corps (CCC) develop a  park.

The CCC worked from 1934 to 1938 developing the park.  They set up camp in the Franklin County Fairgrounds.  The dam and spillway were constructed between 1934 and 1936.  They began filling the lake by August 1937.  Five fish rearing ponds were created from 1936 to 1937 to the east of the lake on  bought by the State Board of Conservation in 1935.  A causeway was created on top of the old dike.  The bathhouse was built between 1935 and 1936, and a footbridge was built in 1937.  The beach adjacent to the bathhouse was completed in October 1936.  The boulders for the spillway and bathhouse construction came from adjacent fields. Other minor structures, which include a flagstone walk and roadways, are also considered historic and were built by the CCC.  The park officially opened on June 5, 1938.  The non-contributing structures were all built after the CCC's involvement.

References

Protected areas established in 1934
Civilian Conservation Corps in Iowa
Rustic architecture in Iowa
Protected areas of Franklin County, Iowa
Buildings and structures in Franklin County, Iowa
National Register of Historic Places in Franklin County, Iowa
State parks of Iowa
Historic districts in Franklin County, Iowa
Historic districts on the National Register of Historic Places in Iowa
Park buildings and structures on the National Register of Historic Places in Iowa
Parks on the National Register of Historic Places in Iowa